Limnonectes dabanus (sometimes known as Annam wart frog) is a species of frog in the family Dicroglossidae. It is found in Cambodia and Vietnam. Its natural habitats are tropical moist lowland forests, rivers, and swamps. Its status is insufficiently known.

References

dabanus
Amphibians of Cambodia
Amphibians of Vietnam
Amphibians described in 1922
Taxonomy articles created by Polbot